The Demerara Falls tree frog (Boana cinerascens) is a species of frog in the family Hylidae found in Bolivia, Brazil, Colombia, Ecuador, French Guiana, Guyana, Peru, Suriname, and Venezuela. Its natural habitats are subtropical or tropical moist lowland forests, subtropical or tropical swamps, rivers, freshwater marshes, intermittent freshwater marshes, rural gardens, and heavily degraded former forests.

References

Boana
Amphibians of Bolivia
Amphibians of Brazil
Amphibians of Colombia
Amphibians of Ecuador
Amphibians of French Guiana
Amphibians of Guyana
Amphibians of Peru
Amphibians of Suriname
Amphibians of Venezuela
Amphibians described in 1824
Taxonomy articles created by Polbot